The Tupolev Tu-95LAL was an experimental aircraft that was a modified Tupolev Tu-95 Soviet bomber aircraft, which flew from 1961 to 1965, analogous to the United States' earlier Convair NB-36H. It was intended to see whether a nuclear reactor could be used to power an aircraft, primarily testing airborne operation of a reactor and shielding for components and crew. The reactor did not actually power the aircraft.

Design and development 
During the Cold War the USSR had an experimental nuclear aircraft program. Without the need to refuel, a nuclear-powered aircraft would have greatly extended range compared to conventional designs.

On 12 August 1955 the Council of Ministers of the USSR issued a directive ordering bomber-related design bureaus to join forces in researching nuclear aircraft. The design bureaus of Andrei Tupolev and Vladimir Myasishchev became the chief design teams, while N. D. Kuznetsov and A. M. Lyulka were assigned to develop the engines. They chose to focus on the direct-cycle system from the start, testing ramjets, jet engines and even turboprops.

The Tupolev bureau, knowing the complexity of the task assigned to them, estimated that it would be two decades before the program could produce a working prototype. They assumed that the first operational nuclear-assisted airplane could take to the air in the late 1970s or early 1980s. In order to gain experience with operational problems, they proposed building a flying testbed as soon as possible, mounting a small reactor in a Tupolev Tu-95M to create the Tu-95LAL.

The VVRL-lOO reactor was fitted in the bomb bay of the aircraft, requiring aerodynamic fairings over the top and bottom. From 1961 to 1969, the Tu-95LAL completed over 40 research flights. Most of these were made with the reactor shut down. The main purpose of the flight phase was examining the effectiveness of the radiation shielding, which was one of the main concerns for the engineers. Liquid sodium, beryllium oxide, cadmium, paraffin wax and steel plates were used for protection. The shielding efficiency is disputed: most sources say that it was at least efficient enough to warrant further work, and indeed, the design of the follow-up prototype, the Tu-119, was started.

As in the US, development was curtailed on grounds of cost and environmental concerns. The emerging potential of intercontinental ballistic missiles made the expensive nuclear aircraft program superfluous, and it was scaled back.

Tu-119
The next stage in the development of a nuclear-powered bomber would have been the Tupolev Tu-119, a modified Tu-95, which would have been powered by both nuclear-fuelled and kerosene-fuelled turboprop engines: two Kuznetsov NK-14A nuclear-fuelled engines inboard, fed with heat from a fuselage-mounted reactor and two kerosene-fed Kuznetsov NK-12 turboprops outboard. The Tu-119 was never completed due to the nuclear-powered bomber project being cancelled on grounds of cost and the dire environmental impact of possible mishaps and accidents.

Specifications (Tu-95LAL) 
Note: the specifications given are those of the Tu-95MS, which were identical to the Tu-95LAL.

See also

References

Citations

Bibliography

External links 

Tu-119 
Ту-95ЛАЛ – самолет с ядерным реактором 
Ту-95ЛАЛ (заказ 247)  (translation)
ЯДЕРНАЯ ЖАР-ПТИЦА (Nuclear firebird) (2008) 

Abandoned military aircraft projects of the Soviet Union
Tupolev Tu-095
Nuclear-powered aircraft
Tu-0119
1960s Soviet experimental aircraft
Four-engined tractor aircraft
Four-engined turboprop aircraft
High-wing aircraft
Aircraft first flown in 1961